The 2022–23 Moldovan Super Liga is the 32nd season of top-tier football in Moldova. The season started on 30 July 2022 and will conclude on 20 May 2023. Sheriff Tiraspol are the defending champions. The winners of the league this season will earn a spot in the first qualifying round of the 2023–24 UEFA Champions League, and the second and third placed clubs will earn a place in the first qualifying round of the 2023–24 UEFA Europa Conference League.

Teams
A total of 8 teams will compete in the league. The top 7 teams from the 2021–22 season and one promoted team from the Divizia A: Dacia Buiucani, returning to the top tier after one year absence.

Managerial changes

Phase I

Results

Phase II

Results

Season statistics
Updated to matches played on 19 March 2023.

Top goalscorers

Hat-tricks

Top assists

Notes

References

External links
 Official website
 uefa.com

Moldovan Super Liga seasons
Moldova 1
2022–23 in Moldovan football